Zemská Banka was a significant state-sponsored financial institution in Prague during the late 19th and early 20th centuries. In 1948, both Zemská Banka and SHKB merged into the state-owned .

History

Zemská Banka was established in 1890 by the authorities of Bohemia under the Habsburg Monarchy.

In the period of turmoil immediately after World War I, Zemská Banka had more assets than any of the joint-stock banks in Czechoslovakia. It opened a branch in Bratislava in 1924 and another one in Uzhhorod in 1937.

As a consequence of the First Vienna Award in November 1938, the assets and operations of the Uzhgorod branch were transferred to Bratislava and Prague. The branch itself ceased business in October 1939, and its residual operations were managed from Prague. Long-term commitments in the territory occupied by Hungary remained managed from Prague, and those in Slovakia were transferred to SHKB in 1940.

In the wake of the 1948 Czechoslovak coup d'état, a legislative act of  mandated the transfer of all operations of Zemská Banka, SHKB, and several other institutions to the newly formed Investiční Banka, most of which was merged into State Bank of Czechoslovakia in 1958.

Head office in Prague
The former head office of Zemská Banka was built on the Na příkopě thoroughfare in 1894–1896, on the location of a former baroque palace that served as Bohemian Museum between 1847 and 1890 and was demolished in 1893. It is a highlight of Art Nouveau in Prague, in which many of the era's recognized artists participated. The building was later altered in 1908–1909 on designs by Polívka, then again in 1927–1928, 1948, and 1988–1989.

The Zemská Banka building had become property of Živnostenská Banka (ZIBA) when the latter was privatized in the 1990s, and thus is also known as the Živnostenská Banka building. UniCredit purchased ZIBA in 2002 and sold the Zemská Banka building in 2011 to CPI Property Group. In 2015, it was announced that Chinese conglomerate CEFC China Energy would purchase the property from CPI to serve as its European headquarters. In late 2018, CNN reported that China's state-owned conglomerate CITIC Group had taken over CEFC's former assets in the Czech Republic.

See also
 Živnostenská Banka
 Bank Krajowy
 Landesbank

References

Defunct Banks of Czechoslovakia
Banks established in 1889